Bhojapur Dam, is an earthfill dam on Mahalungi river near Sinnar, Nashik district in state of Maharashtra in India. The dam's location is near Chas village. The Mahalungi River joins the Pravara River in Sangamner.

Specifications

Purpose
 Irrigation

See also
 Dams in Maharashtra
 List of reservoirs and dams in India

References

Dams in Nashik district
Dams completed in 1972
1972 establishments in Maharashtra